Struthioniformes is an order of birds with only a single extant family, Struthionidae, containing the ostriches. Several other extinct families are known, spanning across the Northern Hemisphere, from the Early Eocene to the early Pliocene, including a variety of flightless forms like the Paleotididae, Geranoididae, Eogruidae and Ergilornithidae, the latter two thought to be closely related to Struthionidae.

Evolutionary history 
According to Mayr and Zelenkov (2021), all Struthioniformes are united by the following characters: "a very long and narrow tarsometatarsus with short trochleae for the second and fourth toes, a tubercle next to the pons supratendineus on the distal end of the tibiotarsus, as well as a shortening of all non-ungual phalanges of the fourth toe except for the proximal one" All known members of the group are thought to have been flightless. Struthioniformes were widely distributed in the Northern Hemisphere during the Eocene, including Paleotididae from Europe, and Geranoididae from North America, and Eogruidae and Ergilornithidae in Asia. Ergilornthids would persist in Asia into the Early Pliocene. Struthionidae, the sister group of Ergilornithidae, likely originated in Asia. Ostriches first appeared in Africa during the early Miocene, around 21 million years ago, before dispering into Eurasia during the late Miocene, beginning around 12 million years ago.

Taxonomy 
After Mayr, and Zelenkov (2021)

 Palaeotididae (Early mid-Eocene, Europe)
 Palaeotis
 Galligeranoides
 Geranoididae (Early-mid Eocene, North America)
 Unnamed clade
 Eogruidae (monotypic)
 Eogrus (mid-Late Eocene, Asia)
 Sonogrus (late Eocene, Asia)
 Unnamed clade
 Proergilornis (late Eocene, Mongolia)
 Unnamed clade
 Ergilornithidae (Late Eocene-Early Pliocene, Asia)
 Struthionidae (Early Miocene-Recent, Afro-Eurasia)

Gallery

References

 
Bird orders
Taxa named by John Latham (ornithologist)
Ratites